David Lurie (born November 18, 1939) is an American equestrian. He competed in two events at the 1960 Summer Olympics.

References

External links
 

1939 births
Living people
American male equestrians
Olympic equestrians of the United States
Equestrians at the 1960 Summer Olympics
Sportspeople from St. Louis